The 2017–18 Drake Bulldogs women's basketball team represents Drake University during the 2017–18 NCAA Division I women's basketball season. The Bulldogs, led by sixth year head coach Jennie Baranczyk, play their home games at Knapp Center and are members of the Missouri Valley Conference. They finished the season 26–8, 18–0 in MVC play to win the MVC regular season championship. They defeated Valparaiso, Southern Illinois and Northern Iowa to become champions of the Missouri Valley women's tournament and earn an automatic trip to the NCAA women's tournament where they lost to Texas A&M in the first round.

Roster

Schedule

|-
!colspan=9 style="background:#004477; color:#FFFFFF;"| Exhibition

|-
!colspan=9 style="background:#004477; color:#FFFFFF;"| Non-conference regular season

|-
!colspan=9 style="background:#004477; color:#FFFFFF;"| Missouri Valley Conference regular season

|-
!colspan=9 style="background:#004477; color:#FFFFFF;"| Missouri Valley Women's Tournament

|-
!colspan=9 style="background:#004477; color:#FFFFFF;"| NCAA Women's Tournament

Rankings

See also
2017–18 Drake Bulldogs men's basketball team

References

Drake Bulldogs women's basketball seasons
Drake
Drake